Pawan Chopra is an Indian actor who  works in films, TV shows and commercials. He received his theatre training from Ebrahim Alkazi Living Theatre.

Filmography

Films

Television

Web series

References

External links
 
 

21st-century Indian male actors
Indian male film actors
Indian male television actors
Male actors in Hindi cinema
Indian television presenters
Living people
Year of birth missing (living people)